Scheeßel (Northern Low Saxon: Scheeßl) is a municipality in the district of Rotenburg, in Lower Saxony, Germany. It is situated on the river Wümme, approx. 10 km northeast of Rotenburg, 45 km east of Bremen, and 70 km southwest of Hamburg.

Scheeßel belonged to the Prince-Bishopric of Verden, established in 1180. In 1648 the Prince-Bishopric was transformed into the Principality of Verden, which was first ruled in personal union by the Swedish Crown – interrupted by a Danish occupation (1712 to 1715) – and from 1715 on by the Hanoverian Crown. The Kingdom of Hanover incorporated the Principality in a real union and the Princely territory, including Scheeßel, became part of the new Stade Region, established in 1823.

The village celebrated its 1,200th anniversary in 2005. However, this was based on the mention of Skaesla in the Diedenhofener Kapitular, issued by Charlemagne on 24 December 805 in Diedenhofen (now Thionville), and there are rival theories as to where Skaesla might be.

The village is host to the annual Hurricane Festival close to the Eichenring motorcycle speedway.

Scheeßel hosted the 2011 Team Long Track World Championship, the competition which has in the past been dominated by Germany. It has also hosted seven Long Track World Champion finals.

Twin towns
Scheeßel is twinned with:

  Tukums, Latvia
  Teterow, Germany

Notable residents
 Paul Carell (1911-1997), Nazi propagandist, lived in Scheeßel after World War II
 Matthias Scherz (born 1971), footballer
 Elke Twesten (born 1963), politician

References

 http://grasstrackgb.co.uk/venue-scheessel/